Grazielanthus is a monotypic genus of flowering plants belonging to the family Monimiaceae. The only species is Grazielanthus arkeocarpus.

It is native to south-eastern Brazil.

The genus name of Grazielanthus is in honour of Graziela Maciel Barroso (1912–2003), a Brazilian botanist. The Latin specific epithet of arkeocarpus refers to arkeo meaning the ark-like structure and "carpus" = fruit or carpel. Which comes from the protection of the fruitlets by the hypanthium (tube or cup-like structure in a flower that includes the bases of sepals, petals, and stamens.
It was first described and published in Kew Bull. 63: 138 (2008).

References

Monimiaceae
Monimiaceae genera
Monotypic Laurales genera